Qalqas or Qilqis is a Palestinian village located four kilometers south of Hebron and adjacent to Beit Hagai. The village is in the Hebron Governorate Southern West Bank. According to the Palestinian Central Bureau of Statistics, the village had a population of 1,149 in 2007. The primary health care facilities for the village are designated by the Ministry of Health as level 1.

History
French explorer Victor Guérin visited  the place in 1863, and described it as "the ruins of a large village".

In 1883, the PEF's Survey of Western Palestine called   the place  Khurbet Kilkis. It was described as having "walls and cisterns, and rock-cut tombs".

References

Bibliography

External links
Survey of Western Palestine, Map 21: IAA, Wikimedia commons 
Qalqas Village (Fact Sheet), Applied Research Institute–Jerusalem, (ARIJ)
 Qalqas Village Profile, ARIJ
  Qalqas Village Area Photo, ARIJ
 The priorities and needs for development in Qalqas village based on the community and local authorities’ assessment, ARIJ

Villages in the West Bank
Hebron Governorate
Municipalities of the State of Palestine